Mexican Train is a game played with dominoes. The object of the game is for a player to play all the tiles from his or her hand onto one or more chains, or trains, emanating from a central hub or "station". The game's most popular name comes from a special optional train that belongs to all players. However, the game can be played without the Mexican train; such variants are generally called "private trains" or "domino trains". It is related to the game Chicken Foot.

Equipment
A double-twelve set of dominoes is marketed as the standard for Mexican Train, and accommodates up to eight players But there are many sets that are commonly used.  The following sets are common, depending on the number of people playing:
 Double-six (2 players)
 Double-twelve (2-8 plyers)
 Double-fifteen (9-12 players)
 Double-eighteen (13 players)

In addition to dominoes, the game also requires:
 One token or marker for each player
 A special spacer, known as the "station" or "hub", used to evenly space the trains around the central domino (optional).
 Pencil and paper to keep score

Many sets of dominoes include a station and special train-shaped tokens for markers, and packaged games with a central "station" and custom tokens are available. However, the station piece is not strictly needed, and anything from coins to poker chips to even pieces of candy or slips of paper can be used as markers.

Objective
The object of all trains games is to be the first player to place all of their dominoes. Dominoes may be placed onto the player's train, onto the Mexican train if available, or on the trains of other players under special circumstances. The middle tile counts as the start of a player's multiple tile train.

Setup
At the start of each round, the dominoes are placed face-side down, shuffled, and drawn by players to form their hands. Using the double-nine set,
players draw dominoes as follows:
 2–4 players: 10 dominoes each
 5–6 players:   9 dominoes each
 7–8 players:    7 dominoes each

Using the double-twelve set, players draw dominoes as follows:
 2–4 players: 15 dominoes each
 5–6 players:   12 dominoes each
 7–8 players:    10 dominoes each

Any remaining dominoes are placed to one side, forming the "boneyard".

Gameplay
With a standard double-twelve set the double twelve is placed in the station. In each successive round the next lower double is used until all doubles are used.  The double-blank is the final round.

Play continues to the left. Each person lays one legally placed domino per turn, or two if the player's first domino is a double.  If they are unable to, they must draw a domino from the boneyard.  If they are able to lay that domino, they must do so immediately.  Otherwise, their turn is over and play continues to the left, each player trying to place all their dominoes by playing matching dominoes one at a time, end to end.

A train can be as long as the players can make it; it ends only when all dominoes that could match its endpoint have already been played. As a result, trains can become quite long, especially with an extended domino set. It is acceptable to "bend" the train 90° or 180° to keep the train on the playing surface, as long as it does not interfere with the endpoints of other trains.

Public trains
All trains begin the game as "public", and all players may play on them. When a player plays a domino on their train it then becomes "private." When a player draws a domino and is unable to play it, they must mark their train as "public" by placing a marker on their train. If a player is deemed to have made a strategic error the highest score of that round is added to theirs.

Players have the option, whether they can play on their own train or not, of playing a domino on any train currently marked "public."  When a player with a "public" train adds a domino to it, it becomes "private" again and may not be played on except by the train's owner.

The Mexican train
The Mexican train is an additional train that anyone may play on during their turn.  They can start the train by playing a domino matching the engine (i.e. the double played at the beginning of the round) or add to the train.

Playing doubles
When a double is played, it is placed perpendicular to the train. Subsequently, adding a domino to the double is called "finishing", "satisfying the double" or "covering the double."

The player that plays the double has to cover the double or their train becomes public and someone else has to cover the double before normal play can resume.

If a double remains unfinished after it has been played, the train becomes a "public" train. No other train can be added to by any player until someone "finishes the double".  Play passes to the next player who can legally play on this train (if the train is theirs, or if they can legally play on "public" trains).  If they cannot "finish the double", they must draw a domino, and if they cannot play it on the double, their own train becomes "public". Single and double blanks are considered wilds. Mexican train dominoes can end on a double.

Branching on doubles as in Chicken Foot is allowed as an option (see Variations below).

Scoring
At the end of each round, the player going out receives 0 points, while all other players receive the sum of all pips (dots) on their dominoes.    The person with the fewest points after all thirteen rounds have been played is the winner.  In the case of a tie, the person with the most 0-point rounds is the winner.  (If this is still a tie, the person with the lowest round total other than 0 is the winner).

Partnerships
With four, six or eight players, the game can be played in teams of two, with partners sitting opposite each other. Rules are identical except that a player's train and their partner's train are considered one and the same (they will usually extend from opposite sides of the station), and thus a player can play on their own end or their partner's, and neither end becomes public until neither partner can play a tile. Scoring is also handled in pairs, with the player who went out scoring zero for their team (even though their partner will have dominoes remaining) and other teams summing their scores for a team score.

Elements of strategy
 It is generally in a player's best interest to keep their train private. By making a train public, the player allows other players to break an impasse in extending the train, but the player loses all other options except to attempt to play on the endpoint of their own train.
 While public trains offer additional options, the player's own private train should be considered first. Trains are usually public because their owners cannot play on them; if that train's endpoint does not change, its owner has no options until they draw a domino they can play on it.
 A player may choose to dump unmatched tiles on public trains first, before starting their own train, to trick the other players into believing that the player cannot start a train.
 If one or more players played on a public train and the endpoint value has changed, play another tile that will change the endpoint value back to its original value or to a value the player is thought not to have.
 Players must always play if they have an eligible tile. They cannot at any time hold back and pass and/or draw for some strategic reason.
 Because a player playing an unfinished double on someone else's train does not have to mark their own train as public, it is recommended that players play doubles on public trains whenever possible. Not only does this remove a major disadvantage to playing an unfinished double, it does not change the endpoint value of the train meaning its owner probably will not be able to play, and other players do have to mark their trains if they cannot finish the double. However double on another player's train gives that player and everyone else (if public) more options.

Variations
There are a number of other versions of the rules for Mexican Train, varying the number of dominoes drawn by each player, the rules for playing doubles, or the number of tiles that can be played during one turn. For example:

Fast game variation
After the starting double has been placed, turns are ignored, and each player focuses on making their own train as long as possible.  Once everyone has made as long of a train as they can, play reverts to turns, using the rules listed above.  This speeds up the game, but eliminates some of the strategies of playing doubles.

Delayed first turn variation
Similar to the fast game variation listed above, instead of simultaneously, each person takes turns playing as many dominoes on their train as possible. Any player that is unable to play on their first turn draws a domino, and may then begin their first turn or pass.  When a player who has passed finally starts their train, they may play as many dominoes as they can string together. After starting their train, players are only permitted to play one domino at a time as usual, unless playing a double.  This version allows a player to save their "first turn" string of dominoes for when they have a chance, instead of being stuck with all dominoes from the beginning.

Branching doubles variation
Once a double has been satisfied, players may continue to branch off of the double in two more directions, meaning the double will have a matching endpoint on all four sides. Often, players like to angle these branches at a 45-degree angle to accommodate for more room. This variant gives players more choice and speeds up the game.

Swan drive variation
A player who can play on their own train may also play one tile on each subsequent public train in clockwise order. Each public train must be played on in order to continue in this manner, and only one tile per train may be played (unless a double must be finished). Once a player cannot play on the next public train, or has looped around to their own train, their turn ends.  While playing on each public train, the player may choose to play on the Mexican train or skip it when he comes to it, making the placement of the train somewhat strategical.  This version makes for a much faster game.

Origins

"Mexican Train" is a name typically used only in the United States. It is believed Mexican Train Dominoes is a variation on a Chinese game called Pai gow, which means "make nine". Chinese laborers brought the game to Latin America once they began working in sugar fields in the mid to late 1800s. Cubans and other Latin American players adopted the game to use dominoes and called it "Domino Cubano". It later arrived in the United States around the 1860s once Cuban laborers began working on U.S. railroads. Americans began referring to the game as "Mexican Train Dominoes" because of its growing popularity among Cuban, Mexican, and other Latin American laborers brought to the United States.

See also
 Chicken foot (game)

References

External links
 Mexican Train on BoardGameGeek

Domino games